The Church of St Nicholas & St John, formerly the Priory Church of St Nicholas, is the parish church of Monkton, a village on the south bank of the Milford Haven Waterway, in south Pembrokeshire, Wales. The church's medieval origins link it to Monkton Priory, founded in the 11th century. It is a Grade I listed building.

Location
The church is 200m southwest of the contemporary Pembroke Castle. It is close to the ruins of Monkton Priory on the south bank of Milford Haven Waterway.

Description
The part-Norman church has an uncharacteristically long nave as a result of changes in function and structure over the centuries. It is built from rubble stone which was probably rendered as traces of render remain. The roofs are slate. There are numerous windows and doors of varying design and age, and much alteration, including signs that there had been an upper floor. Some parts are buttressed. The tall tower has an embattled parapet and projecting stair tower. There are bell-lights, eight bells of date 1897, and a 1907 clock.

Internally, the vaulting may have been added. The font is 1882 on a 13th-century base. The pulpit and lectern are late 19th century. The 1887 organ is by Wade & Meggitt of Tenby. The stained glass is 19th and 20th century. Windows, doors and other structural, functional and decorative features, variously dating from the 12th and all the subsequent centuries, are described in detail in the Cadw listing.

Memorials
There are many memorials and some tombs from the 15th century onwards, including:
Sir Francis Meyricke, died 1603
John Owen, died 1612
Sir Hugh Owen, died 1670
Benjamin Davis, died 1776
Sir Hugh Owen of Orielton, died 1786
Sir Hugh Owen of Orielton, died 1809
Catherine Humphreys, died 1790
Lady Charlotte Owen of Orielton, died 1829
Abraham Leach of Corston, died 1843
and some unidentifiable, probably earlier effigies. A World War I memorial plaque lists the names of 27 killed.

History
The site on which this church now stands was a Celtic Christian community before the coming of the Normans. The precise date of the foundation of this former priory church is not known, but in 1098 a church of St Nicholas was founded within Pembroke Castle. As the precursor to the present castle may have been at Monkton Priory, this may be the foundation date. The comprehensive priory site, of which this church was a part, is described on the Royal Commission's online database Coflein. The priory continued until 1532, when the monasteries were dissolved. The nave of the priory church was retained as the parish church of Monkton; the rest fell into ruin, with part even being used as a tennis court.

Lewis, in his Topographical Dictionary of Wales of 1833 described the church as 
 The parish population at that time was 1,128.

In the 19th century, mostly under the Rev. D. Bowen, vicar from 1877 to 1926, there were major repairs and restoration by local artisans, with new fittings and sympathetic re-use of much older fixtures. Fragments of frescoes were found to be beyond repair, but at the end of the century, mural paintings were added. The restoration completed in 1895 was comprehensively reported in The Welshman.

The church (as the Priory Church of St Nicholas) was first listed in 1951 as a "substantial medieval priory church with vaulted nave, porch and transept, and fine monuments". Further historical details can be found in the Cadw listing.

The present parish is in the Benefice of South West Pembrokeshire, in the Diocese of St Davids, and the church is known as Ss Nicholas & John, Monkton.

References

External links

Further historical information and sources on GENUKI

Grade I listed churches in Pembrokeshire
Grade I listed buildings in Pembrokeshire